To plunder is to indiscriminately take goods by force, notably:

 Legal plunder, appropriation of other people's wealth through public laws
 Nazi plunder, art theft and other items stolen during World War II as part of the organized looting of German-occupied European countries on behalf of Germany′s ruling Nazi Party

Plunder may also refer to:

Art and entertainment
 Plunder (1931 film), a British comedy film, based on the stage play
 Plunder (play), a 1928 stage farce by Ben Travers
 Plunder (RuneQuest), a 1980 fantasy role-playing game
 Plunder (serial), a 1923 film serial
 Plunder, a 1948 novel by Samuel Hopkins Adams
 Looten Plunder, a villain in the television program Captain Planet and the Planeteers

Other uses
 Plunder (comics), a villain in DC Comics
 Operation Plunder, a World War II operation
 Stevie Plunder (1963–1996), guitarist, singer, and songwriter
 Plundering Time (1644–1646), also known as "Claiborne and Ingle's Rebellion"
 Plunders Creek, a stream in Tennessee, U.S.
 A former slang term for baggage
 A former term for household goods
 A former term for personal property

See also
 Plunderer (disambiguation)